A smash cut is a technique in film and other moving picture media where one scene abruptly cuts to another for aesthetic, narrative, or emotional purpose. To this end, the smash cut usually occurs at a crucial moment in a scene where a cut would not be expected. To heighten the impact of the cut, a disparity in the type of scene on either side of the cut is often present, going from a fast-paced frenzied scene to a tranquil one, or going from a pleasant scene to a tense one, for example.

For example, a smash cut could be used in a murder scene: the killer brings a knife plunging down into his victim, and just before the blade pierces the skin, the scene is suddenly replaced with a non-violent use of a cutting edge, such as the chopping of vegetables. Smash cuts are often used when a character wakes up from a nightmare to simulate the jarring nature of that experience.

Smash cutting can also be used to comedic effect: for example, directly after a prediction is made, cutting to the future showing the prediction to have been humorously, and often outlandishly, wrong. One specific variety of smash cut, which depicts a given character resolutely declaring his or her intentions immediately before a cut to a scene depicting the character doing the exact opposite, is known in the United States as a Gilligan cut, so named for the TV show Gilligan's Island, and in the United Kingdom known as a bicycle cut, so named for a scene from Last of the Summer Wine.

See also

 Jump cut
 Match cut

References

Film and video terminology
Cinematic techniques